De Waal is a Dutch surname with the literal translation "the Walloon". Originally it may have also referred to other southern, non-Germanic and French-speaking persons. A variant, archaic spelling is De Wael. Notable persons with that surname include:

De Waal
Alex de Waal (born 1963), British social anthropologist and researcher on African issues
Anastasia de Waal, British educationist
André de Waal (born 1960), Dutch author, assistant professor, business owner and consultant
Anna de Waal (1906–1981), Dutch politician
Anton de Waal (1837–1917), German Christian archeologist and Roman Catholic church historian
Edmund de Waal (born 1964), British ceramic artist
Frans de Waal (born 1948), Dutch ethologist
Hugo de Waal (1935–2007) Bishop of Thetford, cousin of Victor
Jan Hendrik de Waal Malefijt (1852–1931), Dutch Minister of Colonial Affairs
Johan de Waal (born 1949), Namibian politician
Kit de Waal (born 1960) pseudonym of Irish/British writer Mandy O'Loughlin
Pieter de Waal (1899–1977), South African military commander
Nicolaas Frederic de Waal (1853–1932), Dutch Administrator of the Cape Province in South Africa
Rein de Waal (1904–1985), Dutch field hockey player
Simon de Waal (born 1961), Dutch script writer
Thomas de Waal (born 1966), British journalist
Victor de Waal (born 1929), British Anglican priest, father of Alex, Edmund and Thomas
Willem de Waal (born 1978), South African rugby union footballer
De Wael / Dewael
Cornelis de Wael (1592–1667), Flemish painter, engraver and merchant 
Jan de Wael I (1558–1633), Flemish painter and engraver, father of Cornelis and Lucas
Jan Baptist de Wael (1632–1670s), Flemish painter and printmaker in Italy
Johan de Wael (1594–1663), Dutch mayor of Haarlem portrayed by Frans Hals
Leopold De Wael (1823–1892), Belgian merchant and mayor of Antwerp
Lucas de Wael (1591–1661), Flemish painter, engraver and merchant 
Michiel de Wael (1596–1659), Dutch brewer portrayed by Frans Hals
Monique De Wael (born 1937), Belgian-born American author of a fictitious Holocaust memoir
Patrick Dewael (born 1955), Belgian politician, Minister-President of Flanders

See also
Henri van de Waal (1910–1972), Dutch writer and art historian
Henk van der Waal (born 1960), Dutch poet
Leen van der Waal (born 1928), Dutch engineer and politician
Johannes Diderik van der Waals (1837–1923), Dutch theoretical physicist

References

Dutch-language surnames
Afrikaans-language surnames